"Deja Q" is the 13th episode of the third season of the American science fiction television series Star Trek: The Next Generation, and the 61st episode of the series overall. This episode aired on syndicated television in February 1990.

In this episode, as the 24th-century crew of the starship Enterprise D struggles to prevent a moon from falling out of orbit, their situation is further complicated by a visit from a powerful nemesis named "Q" (John de Lancie), who informs them that he has been stripped of all his powers and must live out a mortal life.

The episode is noted for its comedy and exploration of humanity and morality.

Plot
The Federation starship Enterprise arrives at planet Bre'el IV to prevent the looming disaster of the planet's asteroidal moon falling from its orbit and crashing into the highly populated planet; as the ship arrives, the planet is already experiencing damaging effects of the moon's gravitational field. As the crew is working, Q (John de Lancie) appears on the bridge naked. Q explains that he is being punished by the Continuum for spreading chaos throughout the universe and he has been stripped of all his powers, banished from the Q Continuum, and transported to the Enterprise as a human, asking asylum. Captain Jean-Luc Picard (Patrick Stewart) reluctantly helps Q, but instead of assigning him guest quarters, Picard treats Q like a criminal and throws him in the brig.

As the moon continues to descend to the planet, Picard urges Q to use his powers and move the moon back into its original orbit. Q still insists that he is powerless except for his IQ of 2005. The captain assigns Lt. Commander Data to watch Q and he is ordered to assist the Engineering team. Q suggests that they "change the gravitational constant of the universe." Q begins experiencing more human conditions, such as back spasms and hunger. Data takes Q to the Ten-Forward Lounge. When Q inquires about what food is best to address his constant suffering, Data suggests a chocolate sundae as he has observed Counselor Deanna Troi turning to chocolate when depressed. After ordering ten sundaes, his hunger is quickly displaced upon encountering Guinan (Whoopi Goldberg), who takes advantage of Q's mortal form to stab him with a fork. Shortly thereafter, Q is set upon by a cloud of gaseous entities called the Calamarain, who, having previously been tormented by Q, are attempting to get revenge. After raising the shields to prevent the Calamarain from attacking Q, Picard determines that Q took refuge on the Enterprise to protect himself from alien species that hold grudges against him.

Q's idea of changing the gravitational constant of the universe, impossible with human technology, sparks an idea in Chief Engineer La Forge (LeVar Burton) to modify the gravitational constant in a small volume of space, which he tests; however, the test lowers the Enterprises shields, allowing the Calamarain to attack Q again. Data attempts to save Q from their assault but is electrified in doing so, nearly frying his positronic brain. Realizing that his presence on the Enterprise is doing more harm than he expected, Q leaves the ship in a shuttlecraft. As the Calamarain close onto the shuttle, a second Q being (Corbin Bernsen) appears on the shuttle and informs Q that due to his selfless act to protect the Enterprise, the Continuum is willing to give him a second chance and restore his powers. Q accepts and shrinks the Calamarain entities and teleports them into the palm of his hand, gloating over the restoration of his powers. The other Q reminds him that he should reflect upon the lessons he's learned, and he grudgingly turns the tiny aliens loose. Q, dressed as a mariachi, returns to the Enterprise and celebrates. Nudged by Picard to leave, he departs, bestowing a parting gift on Data for showing Q how to be more human. After Q disappears, Data begins to laugh uncontrollably for a moment, to the surprise of the rest of the Enterprise crew. Upon learning that the Bre'el moon has returned to a safe orbit, Picard surmises that Q is responsible, and says that perhaps Q has a residue of humanity after all, but a cigar appears in Picard's hand with Q's voice telling him, "Don't bet on it."

Reception
In 2012, this episode was noted by Forbes as an alternative top ten Star Trek: The Next Generation episode selection. They note it as an excellent episode about Q with a good performance from actor John De Lancie.

Gizmodo ranked "Déjà Q" as the 87th out of 100 of the best of all over 700 Star Trek television episodes as of 2014. In 2019, Mike Bloom writing for The Hollywood Reporter listed "Deja Q" among the twenty five best episodes of the series. They elaborate that this is one of finest episodes with Q, praising his relationship with Data as "delightful" calling them "classmates on the human condition", and finally pointing out this episode is the origin of the famous Picard facepalm internet meme. This was also noted by CNET.

In 2019, Screen Rant ranked "Déjà Q" one of the top ten episodes of Star Trek: The Next Generation, describing it as funny, noting how Q must "reconcile with his newfound mortality", and that it wraps up with a heart-warming ending. That same year, they ranked "Deja Q" the ninth-funniest episode.

Variety magazine noted guest star role of actor Corbin Bernsen as another Star Trek Q alien, also noted for his role on American television series L.A. Law.

In 2020, CBR said this was the 4th best episode with Q, and noted an IMDb rating of 8.6/10 at that time. They praised the episode for exploring what it means to be human, comedic scenes, and having mercy.

Releases
The episode was released with Star Trek: The Next Generation season three DVD box set, released in the United States on July 2, 2002. This had 26 episodes of Season 3 on seven discs, with a Dolby Digital 5.1 audio track. It was released in high-definition Blu-ray in the United States on April 30, 2013.

This episode was released in the "Q Continuum" collection of LaserDisc. The collection was released on July 30, 1997 and was published by Paramount Home Video; it retailed for 100 USD. The set included the 2-part "Encounter at Farpoint", "Hide & Q", "Q Who?", and "Deja Q" on 12 inch optical discs in NTSC format with a total runtime of 230 minutes. The collection came in a Tri-Fold jacket that also included a letter from actor Jon De Lancie.

The episode was released in Japan on LaserDisc on July 5, 1996, in the half season set Log. 5: Third Season Part.1 by CIC Video. This included episodes up to  "A Matter of Perspective" on 12-inch double sided optical discs. The video was in NTSC format with both English and Japanese audio tracks.

References

 Star Trek The Next Generation DVD set, volume 3, disc 4, selection 1

External links

 

 "Déjà Q" rewatch by Keith R.A. DeCandido
 "Déjà Q" rewatch by Zack Handlen of The A.V. Club

Star Trek: The Next Generation (season 3) episodes
1990 American television episodes
Television episodes directed by Les Landau